Bordesley Hall was an 18th-century hall which stood in a 15 hectare (40 acre) park south of the Coventry Road in what is now Small Heath, Birmingham.

It was built for the manufacturer and banker John Taylor in 1767 to replace an existing manor house on land that had previously belonged to the Holte family. Taylor emparked the estate and created an ornamental pool with an island, bridge, and grotto. On his death in 1785 the property passed to his son John and John's wife Sarah Skeye, whose seven children were all born at the Hall. John, jnr was appointed High Sheriff of Warwickshire for 1786.

The hall was burned down in 1791 during the Priestley Riots. It was reportedly rebuilt but sold off in 1840 for housing developments. However, Charles Pye writing of his visit to Birmingham in 1818 states:

References

Manor House
Country houses in the West Midlands (county)
1767 establishments in England
Demolished buildings and structures in the West Midlands (county)
Buildings and structures demolished in 1791